Road Rage is a 1997 novel by British crime-writer Ruth Rendell. Its protagonist is Inspector Wexford, and is the 17th entry in the series. The novel's main themes are the environment and environmental activism.

References

1997 British novels
Novels by Ruth Rendell
Environmental fiction books
Hutchinson (publisher) books
Inspector Wexford series